Can Serra is a Barcelona Metro station, in the L'Hospitalet de Llobregat municipality of the Barcelona metropolitan area, and named after the nearby Can Serra neighbourhood. The station is served by line L1.

The station is located under Parc de les Planes between the Carrer de Molí and the Avinguda d'Isabel la Catòlica. There are entrances from both the park and from Avinguda de Can Serra, which serve an underground ticket hall.

The station opened in 1987, when line L1 was extended from Torrassa station to Avinguda Carrilet station.

See also
List of Barcelona Metro stations
Transport in L'Hospitalet de Llobregat

References

External links

Barcelona Metro line 1 stations
Railway stations in L'Hospitalet de Llobregat
Railway stations in Spain opened in 1987
Railway stations located underground in Spain